Ctenucha laura is a moth of the family Erebidae. It was described by George Hampson in 1898. It is found in Bolivia.

References

laura
Moths described in 1898